The 2021–22 ISU World Standings and Season's World Ranking are the World Standings and Season's World Ranking published by the International Skating Union (ISU) during the 2021–22 season.

The single & pair skating and ice dance rankings take into account results of the 2019–20, 2020–21, and 2021–22 seasons.

The 2021–22 ISU season's world ranking is based on the results of the 2021–22 season only.

The 2021–22 ISU world standings for synchronized skating are based on the results of the 2019–20, 2020–21, and 2021–22 seasons.

World Standings and Season's World Ranking for single & pair skating and ice dance

Season-end World Standings

Men 
.

Women 
.

Pairs 
.

Ice Dance 
.

Season's World Ranking

Men 
.

Women 
.

Pairs 
.

Ice Dance 
.

World Standings and Season's World Ranking for synchronized skating

Season-end World Standings

Senior 
.

Junior 
.

Season's World Ranking

Senior 
.

Junior 
.

References 

ISU World Standings and Season's World Ranking
2021 in figure skating
2022 in figure skating